Estadio Bautista Gargantini is a multi-use stadium in Mendoza, Argentina. It is  the home ground for Club Sportivo Independiente Rivadavia. The stadium holds 24,000 people.

References

External links
Stadium information

Football venues in Argentina
Independiente Rivadavia